Nature Genetics is a peer-reviewed scientific journal published by Nature Portfolio. It was established in 1992. It covers research in genetics. The chief editor is Tiago Faial.

The journal encompasses genetic and functional genomic studies on human traits and on other model organisms, including mouse, fly, nematode and yeast. Current emphasis is on the genetic basis for common and complex diseases and on the functional mechanism, architecture and evolution of gene networks, studied by experimental perturbation.

According to the Journal Citation Reports, the journal has a 2021 impact factor of 41.379, ranking it 2nd out of 175 journals in the category "Genetics & Heredity".

References

External links 
 Official website

Genetics in the United Kingdom
Genetics journals
Monthly journals
Nature Research academic journals
Publications established in 1992